Fistulina hepatica (beefsteak fungus, also known as beefsteak polypore, poor man’s steak, ox tongue, or tongue mushroom) is an unusual  bracket fungus classified in the Agaricales, that is commonly seen in Britain, but can be found in North America, Australia, North Africa, Southern Africa and the rest of Europe.  As its name suggests, it looks remarkably similar to a slab of raw meat.  It has been used as a meat substitute in the past, and can still be found in some French markets. It has a sour, slightly acidic taste.  For eating it must be collected young and it may be tough and need long cooking.

Details 

The cap is 7–30 cm wide and 2–6 cm thick. Is shape resembles a large tongue, and it is rough-surfaced with a reddish-brown colour. The spores are pink and released from minute pores on the creamy-white underside of the fruit body. A younger Fistulina hepatica is a pinkish-red colour, and it darkens with age. It bleeds a dull red juice when cut, which can cause stains, and the cut flesh further resembles meat. It is sour in taste, edible and considered choice by some, although older specimens should be soaked overnight, as their juice can cause gastric upset.

The underside of the fruiting body, from which the spores are ejected, is a mass of tubules.  The genus name is a diminutive of the Latin word fistula and means "small tube", whilst the species name hepatica means "liver-like", referring to the consistency of the flesh.

The species is fairly common, and can often be found on oaks and sweet chestnut, from August to the end of autumn, on either living or dead wood. It has a tendency to impart a reddish-brown stain to the living wood of oaks, creating a desirable timber type. In Australia, it can be found growing from wounds on Eucalyptus trees.  It causes a brown rot on the trees which it infects.

Relationship to other fungi
Fistulina is classified in the family Fistulinaceae; molecular studies suggest close relations to the agaric mushroom Schizophyllum in the Schizophyllaceae (in the schizophylloid clade), but in the separate sister fistulinoid clade. Fistulina is a cyphelloid genus, meaning that it is closely related to gilled fungi, but its fertile surface consists of smooth cup-shaped elements instead of gills.  The underside (the hymenium) is a mass of tubules which represent a "reduced" form of the ancestral gills.

See also
 Forest pathology
 List of meat substitutes

References

External links
 mushroomexpert.com Description and additional links
 Beefsteak fungi and Brown Rot on oak.

Fistulinaceae
Fungi described in 1774
Fungi of Australia
Fungi of Europe
Fungi of North America
Edible fungi
Meat substitutes
Taxa named by Jacob Christian Schäffer